Butterfly flower may refer to:
 Asclepias syriaca
 Schizanthus spp.
 Iris japonica

See also
Butterfly bush
Butterfly weed